Matchedje Nampula, usually known simply as Matchedje Nampula, is a traditional football (soccer) club based in Nampula, Mozambique.

Stadium
The club plays its home matches at Matchedje Arena, which has a maximum capacity of 10,000 people.

References

Nampula
Matchedje Nampula